Thomas Miller "Tammas" McCluskey (31 August 1890 – 4 October 1917) was an Australian rules footballer who played with Carlton and Fitzroy in the Victorian Football League, and with Footscray in the VFA.

Family
The son of Thomas Miller McCluskey (1843-1929), and Jessie Blair McCluskey (1855-1897), née Bell, Thomas Miller McCluskey, known to his family as "Tammas", was born in Kyabram, on 31 August 1890.

Football

Carlton (VFL)
A half-back flanker, McCluskey was recruited from Shepparton Football Club,  by the Carlton Secretary, Arthur Ford, who, having been alerted to the potential of  McCluskey, had gone to see a match between Tatura and Shepparton on  Wednesday 24 August 1910, and was so impressed that he immediately signed up both Shepparton's McClusky and Tatura's Archie Wilson.

Wilson and McClusky both made their debut for Carlton against Richmond, at Princes Park, on the following Saturday, 27 August 1910, and both played for the Carlton First XVIII that lost to Collingwood in the 1910 Grand Final, which was the last of McCluskey's four senior games for Carlton.

Fitzroy (VFL)
In 1911 he transferred to Fitzroy, where he played 5 senior games.

Footscray (VFA)
In 1912 McCluskey was living and working in Footscray, and on 24 April 1912, he was granted a clearance from Fitzroy to play with Footscray. He played 45 matches in three seasons (1912-1914).

Military
McCluskey served on the Western Front during World War I, being killed by a German artillery shell during the Battle of Broodseinde.

See also
 List of Victorian Football League players who died in active service

Footnotes

References
 Roll of Honour: Thomas Miller McCluskey (3107), "Australian War Museum"".
 World War I Service Record: Thomas McCluskey (3107), ''National Archives of Australia".
 Australia's Roll of Honor: 352nd Casualty List: Victoria: Killed in Action, The Age, (Friday, 16 November 1917), p.9.
 Tapner, Warren, "The Great Fallen: Thomas McCluskey", carltonfc.com, 21 April 2015.

External links

 Blueseum: Tom McCluskey Profile
 Tom McCluskey, australianfootball.com
 Tom 'Tammas' McCluskey, at The VFA Project.

1890 births
1917 deaths
Australian rules footballers from Victoria (Australia)
Carlton Football Club players
Fitzroy Football Club players
Footscray Football Club (VFA) players
Shepparton Football Club players
Australian military personnel killed in World War I